The 1988–89 George Mason Patriots Men's basketball team represented George Mason University during the 1988–89 NCAA Division I men's basketball season. This was the 23rd season for the program, the first under head coach Ernie Nestor. The Patriots played their home games at the Patriot Center in Fairfax, Virginia.

After finishing second in the regular season CAA standings, the team won the CAA tournament to receive an automatic bid to the NCAA tournament as No. 15 seed in the West region. The Patriots were beaten by No. 2 seed Indiana in the opening round to finish with a record of 20–11 (10–4 CAA).

Roster

Schedule and results

|-
!colspan=12 style=| Regular season

|-
!colspan=12 style=|CAA tournament

|-
!colspan=12 style=|NCAA tournament

References

George Mason Patriots men's basketball seasons
George Mason men's basketball
George Mason men's basketball
George Mason
George Mason